Eduard Emil Koch (30 January 1809 – 27 April 1871) was a German pastor and hymnologist.

Life 
Koch was born at Solitude Palace, the son of the staff doctor Friedrich Koch and his wife Margarethe Koch, née Sigrist. He completed the Eberhard-Ludwigs-Gymnasium and then the seminary in Urach in Stuttgart, before he went to Tübingen from 1826 to 1830 where he studied theology.

In 1830, he became vicar in Ehningen, in 1837 pastor in Großaspach, where he married Marie Auguste Speidel. The couple had two children. He became pastor in Heilbronn in 1847, promoted further from third pastor to head pastor and dean. His career took a turn when he tried to prevent the performance of Haydn's oratorio The Creation in a church of the Heilbronn deanery. Although the parish council followed his view that such an event was not suitable for a church, the consistory overturned the decision. In protest, Koch applied to be moved to the parish of the village Erdmannhausen. He died of smallpox on a trip to Stuttgart at the age of 62, where he wanted to obtain his complete removal from office. His tomb in the  has been preserved.

In 1847, Koch published the Geschichte des Kirchenlieds und Kirchengesangs, a history of singing hymns in church, of which several new editions were later published.

Publications 
 Geschichte des Kirchenlieds und Kirchengesangs.
 1st Edition, Mit besonderer Rücksicht auf Würtemberg:
 Part 1: Die Dichter und Sänger. Druck und Verlag der Chr. Belser'schen Buchhandlung, Stuttgart 1847 ( by the Bayerische Staatsbibliothek).
 Part 2: Die Lieder und Weisen. Belser, Stuttgart 1847.
 2nd Edition:
 First main part: Die Dichter und Sänger. Vol. 1. Belser, Stuttgart 1852.
 First main part: Die Dichter und Sänger. Vol. 2. Belser, Stuttgart 1852.
 First main part: Die Dichter und Sänger. Vol. 3. Belser, Stuttgart 1853.
 Second main part: Die Lieder und Weisen. Vol. 4. Belser, Stuttgart 1853.
 3rd Edition:
 First main part: Die Dichter und Sänger. Vol. 1. Belser, Stuttgart 1866.
 First main part: Die Dichter und Sänger. Vol. 2. Belser, Stuttgart 1867.
 First main part: Die Dichter und Sänger. Vol. 3. Belser, Stuttgart 1867.
 First main part: Die Dichter und Sänger. Vol. 4. Belser, Stuttgart 1868.
 First main part: Die Dichter und Sänger. Vol. 5. Belser, Stuttgart 1868.
 First main part: Die Dichter und Sänger. Vol. 6. Belser, Stuttgart 1869.
 First main part: Die Dichter und Sänger. Vol. 7. Edited by Adolf Wilhelm Koch after the death of the author. Belser, Stuttgart 1872.
 Second main part: Die Lieder und Weisen. Vol. 8. Newly edited by Richard Lauxmann. Belser, Stuttgart 1876.

References

Cited sources

Further reading 
 Udo Dickenberger, Waltraud and Friedrich Pfäfflin: Der Stuttgarter Hoppenlau-Friedhof als literarisches Denkmal. Marbach am Neckar 1992, .
 Eberhard Hauschildt: Koch, Eduard Emil. In Biographisch-Bibliographisches Kirchenlexikon (BBKL). BVol.4, Bautz, Herzberg 1992, Sp. 206–207.
 Helge Dvorak: Biographisches Lexikon der Deutschen Burschenschaft. vol. I: Politiker. Part 3: I–L. Winter, Heidelberg 1999, .

External links 
 

Hymnologists
19th-century German writers
19th-century German male writers
19th-century Lutheran clergy
University of Tübingen alumni
1809 births
1871 deaths
People from Heilbronn
19th-century musicologists